Halit Akmansü (1883; Daday, Kastamonu Vilayet - 10 February 1953; Istanbul), also known as Dadaylı Halit Bey, was an officer of the Ottoman Army and the Turkish Army.

Medals and decorations
Gallipoli Star
Nichan Iftikhar
Silver Medal of Liyakat
Silver Medal of Imtiyaz
Prussia Iron Cross 1st and 2nd class
Medal of Independence with Red Ribbon

See also
List of high-ranking commanders of the Turkish War of Independence

Sources

External links

Miralay Halit Bey, Kastamonu Daday Halit Bey İlköğretim Okulu 

1880s births
1953 deaths
People from Daday
People from Kastamonu vilayet
Ottoman Imperial School of Military Engineering alumni
Ottoman Military College alumni
Ottoman Army officers
Ottoman military personnel of the Balkan Wars
Ottoman military personnel of World War I
Turkish Army officers
Turkish military personnel of the Greco-Turkish War (1919–1922)
Deputies of Kastamonu
Republican People's Party (Turkey) politicians
Progressive Republican Party (Turkey) politicians
Burials at Turkish State Cemetery
Recipients of the Liakat Medal
Recipients of the Imtiyaz Medal
Recipients of the Iron Cross (1914), 1st class
Recipients of the Medal of Independence with Red Ribbon (Turkey)